Saidabad-e Jajrud (also Romanized as Sa‘īdābād-e Jājrud) is a village in Saidabad Rural District of Jajrud District of Pardis County, Tehran province, Iran. At the 2006 census, its population was 5,082 in 1,419 households, when it was a village in Siyahrud Rural District of the Central District of Tehran County. The following census in 2011 counted 5,534 people in 1,542 households. The latest census in 2016 showed a population of 7,200 people in 2,012 households, by which time it was the largest village and the capital of Saidabad Rural District of Jajrud District in the newly established Pardis County.

After the census, the Central District was established by separating the rural district and the city of Pardis from Bumahen District. The village of Saidabad-e Jajrud was elevated to the status of a city.

References 

Pardis County

Cities in Tehran Province

Populated places in Tehran Province

Populated places in Pardis County